This is a list of Chinese football transfers for the 2016 season winter transfer window. Super League and League One transfer window opened on 1 January 2016 and closed on 26 February 2016. League Two transfer window opens on 1 March 2016 and closes on 15 March 2016.

Super League

Beijing Guoan

In:

 

Out:

Changchun Yatai

In:

 
 
 
 

 
 

Out:

Chongqing Lifan

In:

 

 
 
 
 
 
 
  
 
 

Out:

Guangzhou Evergrande Taobao

In:

 
 
 
 
 

 

Out:

Guangzhou R&F

In:
 
 
 
 
 
 
 
 

Out:

Hangzhou Greentown

In:

 

 
 
 
 

 
 
 

 

Out:

Hebei China Fortune

In:

 
 
 
 
  
 
  
  
  
 
 
 
 
 

 

Out:

Henan Jianye

In:

 
 
 
 
 
 
 
  

Out:

Jiangsu Suning

In:

 
 
 
 
 
 
 
 
 

Out:

Liaoning F.C.

In:

 
 
 
 
 

 
 
 
 

 

Out:

Shandong Luneng Taishan

In:

 
 
 
 

 
 

Out:

Shanghai Greenland Shenhua

In:

 
 
 
 
 
 
 
 
 

Out:

Shanghai SIPG

In:

 

Out:

Shijiazhuang Ever Bright

In:

 
 
 
 
 
 

 

Out:

Tianjin Teda

In:

 
 
 
 
 
 
 
  
 

Out:

Yanbian Funde

In:

 
 
 
  
 
 
 
 
 
 

Out:

League One

Beijing BG

In:

 
 
 

 
 

 

Out:

Beijing Renhe

In:

 
 
 
 
 
 
 

 

Out:

Dalian Transcendence

In:

 
 
 
 
 
 
 
 
 
  
 
 
 

Out:

Dalian Yifang

In:

 
 
 
 
 
 
 
 

Out:

Guizhou Hengfeng Zhicheng

In:

 

 

 
 

Out:

Hunan Billows

In:
 
 
 
 
 
 

Out:

Meizhou Kejia

In:

 
 

 
 

Out:

Nei Mongol Zhongyou

In:

 

 
 

 

 

Out:

Qingdao Huanghai

In:

 
 
 
 
 
 
 
 
 
 
 

 

 

Out:

Qingdao Jonoon

In:

 
 
 
 

Out:

Shanghai Shenxin

In:

 

 

 

Out:

Shenzhen F.C.

In:

 
 

 
 
 
 

 
 

Out:

Tianjin Quanjian

In:

 
 
 
 
 
 
 
 
 
 
 
 
 

Out:

Wuhan Zall

In:

 
 
 
 
 

 

 
 

Out:

Xinjiang Tianshan Leopard

In:

 

 

Out:

Zhejiang Yiteng

In:

 
 
 
 

Out:

League Two

References

2015
2016 in Chinese football
China